Mr. Right refers to the ideal or suitable mate or husband. 

Mr. Right may also refer to:

 Mr. Right, a 1985 album by Joe Simon
 Mr. Right (2009 film), a gay-themed film directed by David Morris and Jacqui Morris
 Mr. Right (2015 film), an American action comedy film, starring Anna Kendrick and Sam Rockwell
 Mr. Right, a 2015 romantic comedy film, starring Erica Tazel and Columbus Short
 "Mr. Right", a song by Leona Lewis on her album Christmas, with Love
 "Mr. Right", a song by Kim Chiu on her album Chinita Princess
 Mr. Right (TV series), a 2018 Chinese television series

See also
 "Florence Meets Mr. Right", a 1979 episode of The Jeffersons
 Mr. Wright, 1985 album by Bernard Wright
 Making Mr. Right, 1987 science fiction comedy film, directed by Susan Seidelman
 "Goodbye Mr. Right", a 1990 episode of Roseanne
 Mr. Right & Mr. Wrong: One Down & Two to Go, a 1994 compilation album by Nomeansno
 "Baby Face/Mr. Right", a 2004 episode of The Fairly OddParents
 "Mrs. Right", a 2011 song by Mindless Behavior
 Finding Mr. Right, a 2013 romantic comedy film written and directed by Xue Xiaolu
 Finding Mr. Right 2, a 2016 romantic comedy film sequel
 Mr. Right Wanted, a 2014 romantic comedy television series directed by Lien Yi-chi